Vazir may refer to:

Vazir Agha, Pakistani writer
Yusif Vazir Chamanzaminli, Azerbaijani writer 
Vazir, Iran
Vizier